Compton is a village and civil parish in the Chichester district of West Sussex. The parish also includes the villages of West Marden and Up Marden.

The village has a long history, perhaps first being mentioned in the will of King Alfred the Great. It is in the Sussex Downs Area of Outstanding Natural Beauty.

High ground nearby is known as Compton Down and on a part of the down known as Telegraph Hill there was an Admiralty semaphore station.

The church of England parish church dedicated to Saint Mary the Virgin, dates from the 12th and 13th centuries, but was heavily restored in 1849. The building is flint-faced with stone dressings and a tiled roof. It has a chancel and nave with south aisle, north porch and western bell turret, which is weather boarded with a shingled spire. It is a Grade II* listed building, and currently forms part of the Octagon Parish team ministry.

References

External links

 'Compton' in A History of the County of Sussex: vol 4 (ed. Louis Francis Salzman, London, 1953, pp. 91–94), from the Victoria County History at British History Online

Villages in West Sussex